Power Plant Mall is an upscale indoor shopping mall in Makati, Philippines. It is the anchor establishment of Rockwell Center, a mixed-use area north of the Makati Central Business District on the Pasig River waterfront across Mandaluyong. It is one of two shopping centers developed and managed by Rockwell Land Corporation, a subsidiary of Lopez Holdings Corporation, in Metro Manila. It was designed by Toronto-based architecture firm, Design International.

Description

The four-level shopping mall is located at Rockwell Drive corner Estrella Street in Barangay Poblacion, Makati. It is part of the Rockwell Center, which includes the One Rockwell West Tower, the ninth tallest building in the metropolis. It also contains several dining outlets, The Fifth at Rockwell events hall, a Roman Catholic chapel called the Chapel of the Sacred Heart of Jesus, and three levels of basement parking.

The mall can be reached from EDSA via Estrella and J. P. Rizal Avenue and from the Makati CBD via Kalayaan Avenue. The nearest MRT station is Guadalupe station on EDSA.

History
Power Plant Mall was built in December 2000 on the former site of the 130-megawatt Rockwell Thermal Plant owned by the Lopez-led Manila Electric Railroad and Light Company. The thermal power plant, named after the company's first president James Chapman Rockwell, operated between 1950 and December 14, 1973 when it was hit by a fire. In 1994, after protests from Makati residents against its reopening, the plant was decommissioned and subsequently converted by its owners into a modern commercial district. Construction on the shopping mall began in 1998 and was completed and opened on December 26, 2000.

Expansion of the mall 

The ground and second levels (R1 & R2) of the expansion opened in December 2017, while Cinemas 7 and 8 at Level R3 opened in January 2018. It is also connected to the luxury condominium development Balmori Suites, replacing the cancelled expansion of Aruga Hotel.

References

Shopping malls in Makati
Shopping malls established in 2000